The name Wilma has been used for five tropical cyclones worldwide: one in the Atlantic Ocean, one in the Australian region of the Indian Ocean, two in the Western Pacific Ocean, and one in the South Pacific Ocean. The name was retired in the Atlantic after the 2005 hurricane season and was replaced with Whitney. The name was retired in the South Pacific after the 2010–11 cyclone season and was replaced with Wano.

In the Atlantic:
 Hurricane Wilma (2005), an extremely powerful and destructive Category 5 hurricane that impacted Jamaica, Central America, Yucatan Peninsula, Cuba, South Florida, Bahamas, and Atlantic Canada.

In the Australian region:
 Cyclone Wilma (1975), formed in the Arafura Sea and made landfall in the Northern Territory of Australia.

In the Western Pacific:
 Typhoon Wilma (1952) (T5219), a Category 5 super typhoon that affected the Philippines and mainland Southeast Asia.
 Tropical Depression Wilma (2013), a long-lived storm that traversed the Philippines, mainland Southeast Asia, and then the Bay of Bengal before making landfall in India.

In the South Pacific:
 Cyclone Wilma (2011), a Category 4 tropical cyclone that affected the Samoan Islands, Tonga and New Zealand

Atlantic hurricane set index articles
Pacific typhoon set index articles
Australian region cyclone set index articles